Ruby Lindsay (20 March 1885 – 12 March 1919) was an Australian illustrator and painter, sister of Norman Lindsay and Percy Lindsay.

Biography 

Lindsay was born in Creswick, Victoria, the seventh child and second daughter of Robert and Jane Lindsay, and lived in Melbourne from the age of 16 with her brother Percy while studying at the National Gallery of Victoria School.

Lindsay drew occasionally for The Bulletin and illustrated William Moore's Studio Sketches (1906) and designed posters. On 30 September 1909 she married Will Dyson.

As an illustrator she went by several names; signing her work as "Ruby Lyne", "Ruby Lyn", "Ruby Lind", and once as "Ruby Ramsbottom".

In 1909 she went to England with her brother Norman, and Will Dyson.  She married Will in 1910.  (Her brother Lionel married Will's sister Jean.)  Ruby and Will had one daughter, Betty (1911–1956).

In 1912, she contributed illustrations to the book Epigrams of Eve by child welfare advocate and journalist Sophie Irene Loeb. After World War I she visited relations in Ireland and died during the Spanish flu pandemic. Lindsay is buried in the same grave as her husband in Hendon Cemetery, London. Her name on the headstone is shown as "Ruby Lind".

Gallery

See also
 1916 Pioneer Exhibition Game

References

External links 

 Bernard Smith, 'Lindsay, Ruby (1885 - 1919)', Australian Dictionary of Biography, Volume 10, MUP, 1986, pp 106–115. Retrieved 2009-09-14
 

1885 births
1919 deaths
20th-century Australian painters
20th-century Australian women artists
19th-century Australian women artists
Australian illustrators
Australian women illustrators
Australian women painters
Deaths from the Spanish flu pandemic in England
Ruby
Australian people of Irish descent
Australian people of English descent
Artists from Victoria (Australia)
People from Creswick, Victoria
National Gallery of Victoria Art School alumni